Palù del Fersina (Mocheno: Palai/Palae en Bersntol) is a comune (municipality) in Trentino in the northern Italian region Trentino-Alto Adige/Südtirol, located about  northeast of Trento.

Palù del Fersina borders the following municipalities: Bedollo, Telve, Baselga di Pinè, Telve di Sopra, Sant'Orsola Terme, Fierozzo and Torcegno.

In the census of 2001, 184 inhabitants out of 195 (94.4%) declared themselves members of the Mócheno linguistic group.

Demographic evolution

References

Cities and towns in Trentino-Alto Adige/Südtirol